A liver shot or liver punch is a punch, kick, or knee strike to the right side of the ribcage that damages the liver. Blunt force to the liver can be excruciatingly painful, and an especially effective shot will incapacitate a person instantly. Thus, in combat sports, liver shots often result in technical knockouts (TKOs).

Because in humans the liver is located in the right upper quadrant of the abdomen, below the diaphragm, a liver punch is usually made with the left hand, or the left hook in infighting, or the regular short body hook, in a short and quick manner. The drive is usually made under and to the front of the ninth and tenth ribs upward to the base of the shoulder blade toward the spine. The punch shocks the liver, the largest gland organ, and a center of blood circulation, and causes the victim to lose focus and drive, and can cause a breathless feeling in the victim. It is usually delivered when feinting an opponent to lead with his right, which leaves the body exposed; the attacker then steps in and delivers a short, stiff uppercut, over the liver, which will likely leave the average man incapacitated. Most of the time, however, a liver punch is unintentional. It begins as a left hook to the body, but as the defending boxer puts his elbow down and begins to roll with the punch, the back is exposed. Thus, the attacking boxer is frequently offered either the arm or the back of the ribs, the latter of which he will usually take instead.

Front kicks and spinning back kicks, which are commonly associated with karate and taekwondo, can also target the liver to great effect.

Examples 

Notable examples of liver shots in combat sport include:
 Vitali Klitschko knocked out Tony Bradham with a liver shot during the second round of his professional debut. 
 Bas Rutten repeatedly knocked down Jason DeLucia with liver punches during their 1996 Pancrase fight, rupturing DeLucia's liver and earning a TKO victory.
 Micky Ward knocked down Arturo Gatti with a liver punch in May 2002.
 Mirko Filipović knocked down Heath Herring with his signature left roundhouse kick to the liver in June 2003 at PRIDE 26.
 Bernard Hopkins knocked Oscar De La Hoya out with a liver shot in 2004.
 Amir Khan knocked Marcos Maidana down in the first round of their fight with a liver shot in 2010.
 Alistair Overeem knocked down Brock Lesnar with a liver kick at UFC 141, December 2011.
 Gennady Golovkin knocked Matthew Macklin out with a liver shot in June 2013.
 Daniel Geale sent Darren Barker to the canvas in the sixth round of their fight with a liver shot in 2013.
 Ronda Rousey knocked Sara McMann down with a knee to the liver at UFC 170, February 2014.
 Lyoto Machida knocked down C.B. Dollaway with a liver kick in December 2014 at UFC Fight Night: Machida vs. Dollaway.
Canelo Alvarez knocked out Liam Smith following a devastating left hook to the liver in round 9. September 2016.
 Anderson Silva rocked Daniel Cormier with a left kick to the liver late in the final third round at UFC 200, July 2016.
 Jake Ellenberger knocked Matt Brown down with a left kick to the liver at UFC 201, July 2016.
 Olivier Aubin-Mercier knocked Evan Dunham down with a knee to the liver at UFC 225, April 2018.
 Vasyl Lomachenko tko'd Jorge Linares in the 10th round to win the WBA Lightweight title, and become the fastest man in history to become a three division champion, on May 12, 2018.
 Poliana Botelho knocked Syuri Kondo down with a left kick to the liver at UFC Fight Night: Maia vs. Usman, May 2018.
 Ben Saunders knocked Jake Ellenberger down with a short knee to the liver at UFC Fight Night 131: Rivera vs. Moraes, June 2018.
 José Aldo knocked Jeremy Stephens down with a left punch to the liver at UFC on Fox: Alvarez vs. Poirier 2, July 2018.
Canelo Alvarez defeated Rocky Fielding by TKO after repeatedly downing Fielding with liver shots, December 2018.
 Michal Oleksiejczuk knocked Gian Villante out with a left punch to the liver at UFC Fight Night: Błachowicz vs. Santos, February 2019.
 Stipe Miocic used repeated liver shots in the 4th round of his second fight against Daniel Cormier.  The liver shots weakened Cormier and allowed Miocic to setup the final flurry of punches which resulted in a TKO and Miocic regaining the Heavyweight title at UFC 241, August 2019.
 Luke Campbell was knocked down in the 7th round by Ryan Garcia by a left punch to the liver in January 2021.
 Naoya Inoue scored three knockdowns in the span of three rounds, each one with a left hook to the liver of Michael Dasmariñas, to win via third-round stoppage, June 19, 2021.
 Usman Nurmagomedov finished Manny Muro at Bellator 263, scoring a TKO, on July 30, 2021.
 Brandon Moreno used a liver kick to put down Kai Kara-France which led to a TKO at UFC 277, July 30, 2022.
 Irene Aldana finished Macy Chiasson with a liver kick from the bottom scoring a TKO at UFC 279 on September 10, 2022.

References 

Terminology used in multiple sports
Boxing terminology
Kickboxing terminology
Martial arts terminology
Strikes (martial arts)